Biblioteca de al-Andalus is a standard encyclopaedia of the academic discipline of Al-Andalus studies. It embraces articles on various aspects of cultural life in Al-Andalus, through the biographies of around 2400 authors and a detailed study of over 10000 texts, focused on different fields of knowledge (literature, Islamic Law, the Quran, linguistics, history, philosophy, medicine, astronomy, etc.). It is the first reference work published by the Fundación Ibn Tufayl de Estudios Árabes within the Al-Andalus Culture Encyclopaedia project. 

Biblioteca de al-Andalus

References

External links 
 Fundación Ibn Tufayl de Estudios Árabes - official page (Spanish) 
 Biblioteca de al-Andalus - online version
 Biblioteca de al-Andalus review Guichard, Pierre: Al-Qantara XXXVIII (2/2007), p. 523-528

Spanish encyclopedias
Encyclopedias of Islam
Encyclopedias of culture and ethnicity
Editorial collections
History books about Spain
Al-Andalus encyclopedias
History books about Islam
Historiography of Spain